Xu Meikun (1893 – January 17, 1997) was an alternate member of the 3rd Central Executive Committee of the Communist Party of China. He was born in Xiaoshan District, Hangzhou, Zhejiang Province. He joined the Communist Party of China in January 1922. In 1927, he was betrayed to the Kuomintang and imprisoned for 8 years. In September 1935, he was released and left the party. He was reinstated in 1981, at the age of 88.

References

1893 births
1997 deaths
Chinese Communist Party politicians from Zhejiang
Politicians from Hangzhou
Alternate members of the 3rd Central Executive Committee of the Chinese Communist Party
Republic of China politicians from Zhejiang